The Loud Minority is an album by American saxophonist Frank Foster recorded in 1972 for the Mainstream label.

Reception

AllMusic awarded the album 3½ stars stating "Foster assembled a giant of a big band featuring dual instrumentation all around, including keyboards, basses, and drummers to power a horn section chock-full of the best mainstream jazz and progressive players of the day... a band that knows no bounds or limits, at its core a mighty modern jazz orchestra removed from Foster's work with the Count Basie band".

Track listing
All compositions by Frank Foster
 "The Loud Minority" – 14:33
 "Requiem for Dusty" – 6:12
 "J.P.'s Thing" – 11:43
 "E.W. – Beautiful People" – 8:48

Personnel 
Frank Foster – tenor saxophone, alto saxophone, soprano saxophone, alto clarinet 
Kenny Rodgers – alto saxophone, baritone saxophone, bass clarinet 
Cecil Bridgewater, Charles McGee – trumpet, flugelhorn
Marvin Peterson – trumpet
Dick Griffin – trombone
Earl Dunbar – guitar
Stanley Clarke, Gene Perla – bass guitar
Harold Mabern, Jan Hammer – piano, electric piano
Richard Pratt, Omar Clay – drums 
Elvin Jones – drums, percussion
Airto Moreira – percussion
Dee Dee Bridgewater – vocals

References 

1972 albums
Frank Foster (musician) albums
Mainstream Records albums
Albums produced by Bob Shad